Karabük University Stadium (Turkish: Karabük Üniversitesi Stadı) is the biggest urban design project in Karabük, Turkey.

Geography 
The 122000 sm Karabük University Stadium is located at the end and upper part of the campus. Stadium has panoramic view to a whole Karabük.

History 
At 2012 urban design projects were prepared. Application of the projects was executed by the Karabük University at 2013 and opened to the public the same year.

Design 
Crescent and star idea emerged from landscape architect Sunay Erdem, design was developed by architect Günay Erdem and all technical details were developed by landscape architect Serpil Öztekin Erdem.

References 

Football venues in Turkey
Sport in Karabük
2013 establishments in Turkey
Sports venues completed in 2013